On November 2, 1948, two squads of Israeli Defense Forces soldiers captured an encampment of Bedouins at Khirbat al-Wa'ra al-Sawda' in the eastern Galilee. While some soldiers guarded the Arabs, others went to a nearby hilltop where the headless bodies of two Israeli soldiers were found. In retaliation, the Arabs' dwellings were destroyed and 15 or 16 adult males were shot, 14 of whom died.

The victims' bodies were buried in a cave adjacent to the place where they were killed. In the 1950s, the Israeli National Water Project was dug through the cave, and the Mawassi people took the bones to another cave. During the 1980s the bones were moved to a common grave in the Muslim cemetery in Eilabun.

References

Sources
Morris, Benny (2001). Revisiting the Palestinian Exodus of 1948. In The War for Palestine, Eugene L. Rogan and Avi Shlaim (Eds.). Cambridge: Cambridge University Press, p. 57 (citing Israel Defense Forces Archives 1096\1949\\65). 
Khalidi, Walid (ed.) (1992), All That Remains. Washington: Institute for Palestine Studies, 1992.

See also
 Killings and massacres during the 1948 Palestine war

External links
 Welcome To al-Wa'ra al-Sawda', Khirbat
 

1948 massacres of Palestinians
Massacres in Mandatory Palestine
Massacres of men
November 1948 events in Asia
Violence against men in Asia
Zionist terrorism